Masil al-Jizl was a Palestinian Arab village in the District of Baysan. It was depopulated by the Israel Defense Forces during the Arab-Israeli War. It was attacked and depopulated on May 31, 1948, as part of Operation Gideon.

History
There were several archeological sites in the vicinity, including Tall al-Qitaf, Kh.  al-Hajj Mahmud and Tall  al-Shaykh Dawud.

British Mandate era
In  the 1922 census of Palestine, conducted by the  Mandatory Palestine authorities,  Mesil al-Jezel had a population of 64; all Muslims, increasing in the  1931 census   to 197 Muslims, in a total of 47 houses.

In  the  1945 statistics, the population was 100 Muslims, with a total of 976 dunams of land.  Of this, 252 dunams were for plantations and irrigated land, 702  for cereals, while 22 dunams  were non-cultivable land.

Village land currently used by Kfar Ruppin.

References

Bibliography

External links
 Welcome To Masil al-Jizl
  Masil al-Jizl,  Zochrot
Survey of Western Palestine, Map 9: IAA, Wikimedia commons 

Arab villages depopulated during the 1948 Arab–Israeli War